= Opinion polling for the 1953 Canadian federal election =

This article is about polls leading up to the 1953 Canadian federal election.

== During the 22nd Parliament of Canada ==
Evolution of voting intentions at national level
Polling firm	Last day of survey	Source	LPC	PC	CCF	SC	Other	Undecided	ME	Sample
Election 1953	August 10, 1953		48.43	31.02	11.28	5.40	3.87			
Gallup	August 1953		45	27	10	5	1	12	—	—
Gallup	April 1953		46	31	13	—	10	—	—	—
Gallup	March 1953		43	33	13	—	11	—	—	—
Gallup	December 1952		46	31	13	—	10	—	—	—
Gallup	July 1952		46	34	12	—	8	—	—	—
Gallup	February 1952		46	33	12	—	8	—	—	—
Gallup	November 1951		46	32	14	—	8	—	—	—
Gallup	October 1951		47	32	14	—	7	—	—	—
Gallup	September 1951		47	31	15	—	7	—	—	—
Gallup	July 1951		49	30	14	—	7	—	—	—
Gallup	June 1951		50	29	13	—	8	—	—	—
Gallup	April 1951		54	27	12	—	7	—	—	—
Gallup	February 1951		51	28	14	—	7	—	—	—
Gallup	July 1950		51	29	13	—	7	—	—	—
Gallup	May 1950		50	28	14	—	8	20	—	—
Gallup	February 1950		51	28	14	—	7	—	—	—
Gallup	January 1950		53	28	13	—	6	—	—	—
Gallup	October 1949		54	27	13	—	6	17	—	—
Election 1949	June 27, 1949		49.15	29.65	13.42	2.31	5.47			
